Andreas Gielchen (27 October 1964 – 3 February 2023) was a German professional footballer who played as a defender and midfielder.

Honours
1. FC Köln
 UEFA Cup finalist: 1985–86
 DFB-Pokal finalist: 1990–91
 Bundesliga runner-up: 1988–89, 1989–90

References

External links
 

1964 births
2023 deaths
People from Eschweiler
Sportspeople from Cologne (region)
German footballers
West German footballers
Footballers from North Rhine-Westphalia
Association football midfielders
Germany under-21 international footballers
Bundesliga players
2. Bundesliga players
1. FC Köln players
1. FC Köln II players
MSV Duisburg players
Alemannia Aachen players